= Kampung Durian Tunjong =

Village in Federal Territory of Labuan, Malaysia

- Village
- Location in Malaysia
- Coordinates: 5.32683954636972°N 115.23532525332712°E
- Country: Malaysia
- Federal Territory: Labuan
- Time zone: UTC+8 (MST)

Kampung Durian Tunjong is a village in Federal Territory of Labuan, Malaysia.
